The 2005 Banquet 400 presented by ConAgra Foods was the 30th stock car racing race of the 2005 NASCAR Nextel Cup Series season, the fourth race of the 2005 Chase for the Nextel Cup, and the fifth iteration of the event. The race was held on Sunday, October 9, 2005, before a crowd of 125,000 in Kansas City, Kansas, at Kansas Speedway, a 1.5 miles (2.4 km) permanent D-shaped oval racetrack. The race took the scheduled 267 laps to complete. At race's end, Mark Martin of Roush Racing would take control of the race in the late stages to win his 35th career NASCAR Nextel Cup Series win and his first and only win of the season. To fill out the podium, teammates Greg Biffle and Carl Edwards would finish second and third, respectively.

The race was the NASCAR Nextel Cup Series debut for Denny Hamlin.

Background 

Kansas Speedway is a 1.5-mile (2.4 km) tri-oval race track in Kansas City, Kansas. It was built in 2001 and hosts two annual NASCAR race weekends. The NTT IndyCar Series also raced there until 2011. The speedway is owned and operated by the International Speedway Corporation.

Entry list

Practice

First practice 
The first practice session was held on Friday, October 7, at 12:30 PM CST, and would last for one hour.

Second and final practice 
The second and final practice session, sometimes known as Happy Hour, was held on Friday, October 7, at 2:35 PM CST, and would last for one hour and 20 minutes.

Qualifying 
Qualifying was held on Saturday, October 8, at 10:40 AM CST. Each driver would have two laps to set a fastest time; the fastest of the two would count as their official qualifying lap.

Two drivers would crash in qualifying: debuter Denny Hamlin would crash on his second lap coming into Turn 3, and Kasey Kahne would crash on his warm-up lap coming into the frontstretch. While both drivers would qualify on owner's points, they would both have to start at the back for the race due to switching to a backup car.

Six drivers would fail to qualify: Robby Gordon, Carl Long, Wayne Anderson, Tony Raines, Eric McClure, and P. J. Jones.

Full qualifying results

Race results

References 

2005 NASCAR Nextel Cup Series
NASCAR races at Kansas Speedway
October 2005 sports events in the United States
2005 in sports in Kansas